Alessandro Corona (born 9 January 1972, in Ortona) is an Italian rower. He won the bronze medal in the quadruple sculls at the 1992 Summer Olympics

External links 
 
 
 
 

1972 births
Living people
Italian male rowers
People from Ortona
Olympic rowers of Italy
Rowers at the 1992 Summer Olympics
Rowers at the 1996 Summer Olympics
Rowers at the 2000 Summer Olympics
Rowers at the 2004 Summer Olympics
Olympic bronze medalists for Italy
Olympic medalists in rowing
World Rowing Championships medalists for Italy
Medalists at the 1992 Summer Olympics
Sportspeople from the Province of Chieti
20th-century Italian people
21st-century Italian people